Alfred Wurr (born 28 June 1943, in Hamburg) is a Canadian former wrestler who competed in the 1972 Summer Olympics. He was inducted into the Manitoba Sports Hall of Fame in 1982.

See also

 List of German Canadians

References

External links 
 
 

1943 births
Living people
Canadian male sport wrestlers
Olympic wrestlers of Canada
Wrestlers at the 1972 Summer Olympics
Commonwealth Games medallists in wrestling
Commonwealth Games silver medallists for Canada
Wrestlers at the 1970 British Commonwealth Games
Manitoba Sports Hall of Fame inductees
Sportspeople from Hamburg
German emigrants to Canada
20th-century Canadian people
Medallists at the 1970 British Commonwealth Games